Be a Mother (Chinese: 母語) is a 2011 Chinese drama film directed by Yu Zhong.

Cast
Alex Fong as Zhang Qing
Wang Pei as Fang Yun
Qin Lan as Li Yan
Wu Ma
Sun Guitian
Zhou Xiaoou

References

Chinese drama films
2011 drama films
2011 films